The ancient Funan sites of Angkor Borei and Phnom Da are located in the Angkor Borei District, Takéo Province, of southern Cambodia. It is in southern part of Cambodia, about 10 kilometers from the western split of Mekong river delta, 150 kilometers from the seacoast, and near the Vietnam border. The Angkor Borei site was an early capital and a region where southeast Asian culture and arts fused in the ancient times. Archaeological excavations have yielded items that are carbon dated to roughly 400 BC and thereafter, many related to early Buddhism and Hinduism, confirming a continuous human settlement at least for some 2,500 years.  They contain the earliest known dated Khmer inscriptions as well as the earliest tradition of Khmer sculpture.  

The Phnom Da is a granite outcrop and a historic site about 3 kilometers from Angkor Borei. It is notable for the oldest surviving temples, Khmer and Sanskrit inscriptions and as a source of the earliest stone statues in Cambodia that can be dated with reasonable certainty based on the epigraphical evidence, iconography and style.  These are attributed to the reign of King Rudravarman (514–539 CE), and confirm the adoption of ideas from what is now Vietnam and India, along with the Cambodian creativity and innovation with design. Among these is the Triad of Phnom Da, a stone statue set of three avatars of Vishnu – as Vishnu, Rama and Balarama (related to Krishna). Other free standing stone statues found here – such as the Trivikrama, Krishna Govardhana and Hari Kambujendra – relate to Hinduism, with a style and iconography similar to the late or post-Gupta Empire period. The Phnom Da site also has the oldest standing Khmer stone temple (6th-century CE), with evidence that wooden Hindu temples preceded it and were the original house of some of the stone statues of Vishnu and his avatars that are found here. Most of these statues have been moved to the Phnom Penh National Museum, in the capital of Cambodia.

In recent years, the archeological sites have attracted a growing number of tourists. At the same time, looting and illicit trafficking of antiquities continue as a serious problem in the area.

World Heritage Status 
This site was originally added to the UNESCO World Heritage Tentative List on September 1, 1992, in the Cultural category. The submission has been renewed on March 27, 2020.

Images

References 

Funan
Khmer Empire
Archaeological sites in Cambodia
Buildings and structures in Takéo province
Angkorian sites in Takéo Province